is a city located in Shiga Prefecture, Japan. , the city had an estimated population of 46,976 in 20601 households and a population density of 68 persons per km2.

Geography
Takashima is located on the western shore of Lake Biwa in the northwestern portion of Shiga Prefecture. The Adogawa and Ishida rivers form alluvial fans in the eastern part of the city on the shores of Lake Biwa, whereas the inland areas rise to the Nosaka and Hira Mountains. The former Makino town region of the city has the Kaizu Osaki, which has been selected as one of Japan's Top 100 Cherry Blossom Spots, and the area is also well known for its Asian fawn lily colonies. The inland areas of the city are noted for very heavy snow accumulation in winter.

Neighboring municipalities 
 Shiga Prefecture
Ōtsu
Nagahama
 Kyoto Prefecture
Sakyō-ku, Kyoto
Nantan
 Fukui Prefecture
Obama
Tsuruga
Wakasa
Mihama
Ōi

Climate
Takashima has a Humid subtropical climate (Köppen Cfa) characterized by warm summers and cool winters with light to no snowfall.  The average annual temperature in Takashima is 13.5 °C. The average annual rainfall is 1801 mm with September as the wettest month. The temperatures are highest on average in August, at around 25.3 °C, and lowest in January, at around 2.3 °C.

Demographics
Per Japanese census data, the population of Takashima has remained relatively steady over the past 60 years.

History 
Takashima is part of ancient  Ōmi Province and has been settled since at least the Yayoi period. The Kofun period Emperor Keitai was born in what is now Takashima, and there are many burial tumuli within the city limits. The city is located on the shortest route between the Asuka and Nara period capitals of Japan and the Sea of Japan coastline and was thus an important thoroughfare for both domestic and international travel and commerce in the ancient period. It was also the site of a major battle of the Jinshin War. From the late Heian period and into the Kamakura period and beyond, the area came under then control of the powerful Sasaki clan and was ruled by a cadet branch of the clan, the Takashima clan, from their stronghold at Shimizuyama Castle. The clan was destroyed by Oda Nobunaga in the wars of the Sengoku period and after the establishment of the Tokugawa shogunate, much of the city area came under the control of the 20,000 koku Ōmizo Domain.

The village of Ōmizo was established within Takashima District, Shiga with the creation of the modern municipalities system on April 1, 1889. It was elevated to town status on November 1, 1902. After merging with neighboring Takashima and Mizuo villages on April 29, 1943, it was renamed the town of Takashima. On January 1, 2005, Takashima merged with the towns of Adogawa, Imazu, Makino and Shin'asahi, and the village of Kutsuki (all from Takashima District) to form the city of Takashima.

Government
Takashima has a mayor-council form of government with a directly elected mayor and a unicameral city council of 18 members. Takashima contributes two members to the Shiga Prefectural Assembly. In terms of national politics, the city is part of Shiga 1st district of the lower house of the Diet of Japan.

Economy
The economy of Takashima is centered on agriculture and light manufacturing.

Education
Takashima has 13 public elementary schools and six public middle schools operated by the city government. There are two public high schools operated by the Shiga Prefectural Department of Education, and one private high school. The prefecture also operates one special education school for the handicapped.

Transportation

Railway
 JR West – Kosei Line
  -  -  -  -  -

Highway
  Meishin Expressway

Sister city 
  Petoskey, Michigan, United States (1976)

Local attractions 
Shimizuyama Castle ruins, National Historic Site
Tōju Shoin, National Historic Site

Notable people
Kakuzo Kawamoto, politician
Yasuzo Shimizu, educator and Christian missionary

References

External links 

  

Cities in Shiga Prefecture
Takashima, Shiga